Milan Škopek (born 22 January 1959) is a Czech rower. He competed at the 1980 Summer Olympics and the 1988 Summer Olympics.

References

1959 births
Living people
Czech male rowers
Olympic rowers of Czechoslovakia
Rowers at the 1980 Summer Olympics
Rowers at the 1988 Summer Olympics
Rowers from Prague